William Millican Randolph (September 19, 1893 – February 17, 1928) was a U. S. Army aviator from 1919 to 1928, until he was killed in an air crash. Randolph Field, Texas, was named in his honor.

Biography
William M. Randolph was born in Austin, Texas. He attended the Agricultural and Mechanical College of Texas prior to enlisting in the U. S. Army in 1916. He completed pilot training at Kelly Field, Texas, in 1919, too late for World War I.
  
He served in 1928, as adjutant of the Air Corps Flying School at Kelly Field, on an Army Air Corps committee that was seeking a location for a new aviation training field in Texas.

Wrecks a Fokker
The Associated Press carried this wire report on 19 April 1920: "MODESTO, April 19. - Lieutenant W. M. Randolph of Rockwell Field, driving his German Fokker plane W-7 [probably a Fokker D.VII] from Rockwell Field to the aeronautical show at San Francisco, wrecked the plane here this afternoon when he attempted to make a landing at the edge of the aviation field. The under part of the machine was completely torn away, but the pilot escaped without injury. His engine was stopped when he attempted to alight, and when the wheels struck a ditch he was unable to get the engine started in time to take the air again, and the Fokker, making a leap of about 50 feet, turned turtle and was put out of commission. The dismantled machine will be shipped to San Francisco."

Death
On 17 February 1928, Capt. Randolph was killed in the crash of a Curtiss AT-4 Hawk, 27–220, three miles NW of Gorman, Texas, after takeoff from Gorman Field. In September 1929, the Army Air Corps named its field north of San Antonio, Texas, Randolph Field for the Austin, Texas, native. Randolph was interred at Fort Sam Houston, Texas.

The Air Corps News Letter published this report on 31 March 1928:

References

1893 births
1928 deaths
United States Air Force officers
Aviators killed in aviation accidents or incidents in the United States
People from Austin, Texas
Texas A&M University alumni
Aviators from Texas
Military personnel from Texas
Burials at Fort Sam Houston National Cemetery